Ron Cameron may refer to:
 Ron Cameron (biblical scholar) (born 1951), American biblical scholar
 Ron Cameron (businessman), (born 1944/1945), American businessman, owner of Mountaire Farms
 Ron Cameron (rower) (1923–2009), Canadian who competed in the 1948 Olympics
 Ron Cameron (sportscaster)
 Ronald B. Cameron, American congressman
 Ronald G. Cameron, member of the California legislature
 Ronnie Cameron (born 1989), American football defensive end
 Green Party of Canada candidates in the 2004 Canadian federal election#Ron Cameron (Winnipeg South)